Norwegian county road 414 (Fv414) is a Norwegian county road in Agder county, Norway. The south end of the road begins at a junction with Norwegian County Road 415 at the Ekra farm in Ubergsmoen and heads north along the Hauglandselva river, through the village of Myra where the junction with Norwegian County Road 416 is located, past the Vegårshei Church, all the way to the north end of the road at the Høl farm. The road then turns into Norwegian County Road 91.

References

414
Road transport in Agder
Vegårshei